Cryptazeca kobelti is a species of gastropod in the family Cochlicopidae. It is endemic to Spain.

References

Fauna of Spain
Cryptazeca
Endemic fauna of Spain
Gastropods described in 1983
Taxonomy articles created by Polbot